Tengami is an adventure video game. It was released on iOS on February 20, 2014, on the Wii U on November 13, 2014, on Microsoft Windows and macOS on January 15, 2015, and on Android on November 5, 2015.

The game is an adventure game that takes place in ancient Japan. The style looks similar to traditional Japanese painting, with a 3D pop-up book look. The game includes puzzle-solving.

Reception

Eurogamer criticized the game, noting that while it had "a nice idea and some gorgeous artwork," it was "a mechanical MacGuffin hunt with no characters, no narrative, no substance or resonance beyond a couple of wistful haikus about seasons passing". It said the puzzles were not very elaborate, with movement being tedious.

218,000 downloads of Tengami have been sold across all platforms , with 196,000 on iOS devices, 11,000 on PC and Mac, and another 11,000 on Wii U, which exceeded Nyamyam's expected sales on the console.

References

2014 video games
Adventure games
Android (operating system) games
IOS games
MacOS games
Video games scored by David Wise
Video games developed in the United Kingdom
Video games set in feudal Japan
Wii U eShop games
Windows games

Single-player video games
Puzzle video games